Muthiah Annamalai Muthiah Chettiar Muthiah (5 September 1929 - 24 January 1970) was an Indian industrialist and politician. The oldest son of M. A. Muthiah Chettiar, Muthiah served as President of the Southern Indian Chamber of Commerce. From 1948 to 1970, Muthiah was the titular Kumarrajah of Chettinad.

Tamil businesspeople
1970 deaths
1929 births